Simon Christopher Coombs (born 21 February 1947), is a former British Conservative politician.

Coombs was MP for Swindon from 1983 until 1997 when the seat was divided by boundary changes. Coombs stood in the new Swindon South seat but lost to Labour's Julia Drown. He stood again for the seat in 2001, but was unsuccessful.

Coombs' Parliamentary term coincided with Swindon being the centre of a technology boom. Sir Tim Berners Lee developed the idea of the World Wide Web while at the Science and Engineering Research Council (SERC) in Swindon. Coombs served as Treasurer of PITCOM, the Parliamentary Information Technology Committee and as Parliamentary Private Secretary (PPS) to Rt. Hon Kenneth Baker, MP, Minister of Information Technology in the Department of Trade and Industry, and as PPS to Baker during his 1984–85 term as Minister for the Environment. He later served as PPS to Rt. Hon Ian Lang, MP during his terms as Secretary of State for Scotland (1992–1995) and President of the Board of Trade (1995–1997). Coombs also served as Parliamentary advisor to the UK Cable Television Association, representing at the time the constituency with the highest cable penetration in the country. He was also Chairman of the Conservative Backbench Tourism Committee and a member of the British Recording Industry Association's All-Party Parliamentary Group and the Select Committee on Employment. Since leaving Parliament, he has kept active in the music sphere as a trustee of the Ralph Vaughan Williams  Society and organizer of the Vaughan Williams exhibition in the composer's home village of Down Ampney.

References
Times Guide to the House of Commons, Times Newspapers Limited, 1997

External links 
 

1947 births
Living people
Conservative Party (UK) MPs for English constituencies
UK MPs 1983–1987
UK MPs 1987–1992
UK MPs 1992–1997